The Toth Family is a 1969 Hungarian comedy-drama film directed by Zoltán Fábri. It was entered into the 7th Moscow International Film Festival.

Cast
 Zoltán Latinovits as Major (Őrnagy)
 Imre Sinkovits as Tóth Lajos, fire-chief
 Márta Fónay as Mariska, Tóth's wife
 Vera Venczel as Ágika, Tóth's daughter
 Antal Páger as Tónay, parson
 István Dégi as Gyuri, the postman
 János Rajz as Sóskúti, machinist

References

External links
 

1969 films
1969 comedy-drama films
1960s satirical films
Hungarian comedy-drama films
Hungarian satirical films
1960s Hungarian-language films
Films directed by Zoltán Fábri